The 2021–22 BFF U-18 Football League is the inaugural edition of BFF U-18 Football League, replacing the BFF U-18 Football Tournament. Youth teams of 10 BPL clubs competing in the league. Uttar Baridhara withdrew themselves two days before kicking off the league citing financial crisis, while Saif SC didn't participate as they closed their football department.

Sheikh Jamal DC U-18 is the defending champion having won 2021–22 season title.

Format
The teams would entirely feature U-18 players. The eleven team will play ten matches again each other in a single round basis. A total of 55 matches will be played. The teams occupying league table positions 1, 2 & 3 will be awarded Champions, Runner-up & Third place prize money. The league does not have a relegation system as of the first season.

Venues
All matches are playing following two ground.

Teams

Standings

League table

Results

Season statistics

Goalscorers

Unknown Goalscorers
Sheikh Russel KC U-18 2-2 Rahmatganj MFS U-18 match of 4 goals scorers players name unknown.

Hat-tricks

See also
BPL (2021–22)
BFF U-16 (2021–22)

Notes

References

Youth football in Bangladesh
Football leagues in Bangladesh
2022 in Bangladeshi football
2022 in Bangladeshi sport
2022 in Bangladesh
2022 in association football
2022 in Asian football